Bell Ord Forrest is I Love You (Yah Tibyah La Blu)'s first full-length studio album released on October 27, 2009 on Joyful Noise Recordings.

Track listing

"The Colloquialism Is Simply "Gas"" – 4:20
"This Is the Best Birthday Ever" – 3:24
"Freelance Pedestrian" – 1:51
"Cliff Drive Nights" – 3:36
"Making Snow Angels in Angel Dust" – 8:01
"Graceland is Better Without Elvis" – 1:05
"Pillow Talk" – 4:43
"Sorry I Drank Your Soda" – 4:34

In The Media
 Joyful Noise releases Bell Ord Forrest by new signing I Love You TODAY! (Movement News Blog)
 "Bell Ord Forrest" (Babysue)
 "Bell Ord Forrest Review" (Indie Surfer Blog)
 "I Love You: Bell Ord Forrest" (Fensepost)
 "A Band From a City That Doesn't Care" (Flagpole Magazine)
 "It’s like Talking Heads or B52 being converted into this millenniums Now People." (Ptolemaic Terrascope)
 "Song of the Day - The Colloquialism Is Simply Gas by I Love You" (Present Magazine)

References

External links
Song Description

I Love You (Yah Tibyah La Blu) albums
2009 albums
Joyful Noise Recordings albums